Gordus may refer to:
 Gordus (Lydia)
 Gordus (Troad)